George Mandler (June 11, 1924 – May 6, 2016) was an Austrian-born American psychologist, who became a distinguished professor of psychology at the University of California, San Diego.

Career

Mandler was born in Vienna, Austria in 1924. He received his B.S. from New York University, and his Ph.D. degree from Yale University in 1953 after serving in the U.S. Army Military Intelligence Service and Counter Intelligence Corps in World War II. Later he studied at the University of Basel and taught at Harvard University and the University of Toronto. In 1965 he became the founding chair of the Department of Psychology at the University of California at San Diego and the founding Director of the Center for Human Information Processing (CHIP) the home of scientists such as Geoffrey Hinton, Donald A. Norman and David E. Rumelhart. His Festschrift was published in 1991. He retired in 1994 and also became a Visiting Professor at University College London. In 2004, UCSD named Mandler Hall in recognition of his contributions to the university. Mandler had emigrated from Vienna to England and eventually to the US after the German invasion in 1938. In 2009, he was awarded an honorary doctorate from the University of Vienna.

Mandler was a leader and participant in the so-called cognitive revolution in mid-twentieth century.  His contributions related the fields of cognition and emotion and the importance of autonomic feedback, the development and use of organization theory for an understanding of memory storage, recall, and recognition  (see "Organization and memory" in Spence & Spence, and, the development of dual process recognition theory, and the revival of the role of consciousness in modern psychology. A consequence of the structural and organizational approach to human information processing (Mandler, 1967) was the postulation of a general limit on the structures of human thought (Mandler, 2013), following Miller's initial foray (1956). Mandler discussed the limit of 4 ± 1  to working memory, categorization, subitizing, and reasoning.  In the 1950s, together with S. B. Sarason, he initiated research on test anxiety. Among his books are Mind and Emotion, Mind and Body, Human Nature Explored, Consciousness Recovered, and A History of Modern Experimental Psychology. He was a Fellow at the Center for Advanced Study in the Behavioral Sciences, received the William James Award from the American Psychological Association (APA), a Guggenheim Fellowship, and Fellowship status in the American Academy of Arts and Sciences, the Society of Experimental Psychologists, and the Cognitive Science Society.

Mandler's professional contributions include the editorship of Psychological Review, Governing Board member and chair of the Psychonomic Society, president of two Divisions of APA (Experimental Psychology and General Psychology), chair of the Council of Editors of APA, chair of the Society for Experimental Psychologists, and founding president of the Federation of Behavioral, Psychological, and Cognitive Sciences.

He died in May 2016 at the age of 91.

Books by George Mandler 
 Mandler, G., and Kessen, W. (1959). The Language of Psychology. New York:  John Wiley & Sons, Inc.
 Reprinted in Science Editions, 1964. Reprint edition:  Huntington, N.Y.: Krieger, 1975.
 Italian edition:  Il linguaggio della psicologia. Bologna:  Il Mulino, 1977.
 Mandler, Jean M., and Mandler, G. (1964). Thinking: From Association to Gestalt.  New York: John Wiley & Sons, Inc.
 Reprint edition: Westport, Conn.: Greenwood Press, 1982.
 Mandler, G. (1975). Mind and Emotion.  New York: Wiley. Reprint edition: Melbourne, Florida: Krieger, 1982.
 German edition: Denken und Fühlen. Paderborn: Junfermann, 1980.
 Mandler, G. (1984). Mind and body: Psychology of emotion and stress. New York: Norton.
 Behavioral Sciences Book Club selection, 1985.
 Japanese edition: Seishin Shobo Publishers, 1987.
 Mandler, G. (1985). Cognitive psychology: An essay in cognitive science. Hillsdale, N.J.: Lawrence Erlbaum Associates.
 Mandler, G. (1997). Human nature explored. New York: Oxford University Press.
 Mandler, G. (2002). Interesting times: An encounter with the 20th century. Mahwah, NJ: Lawrence Erlbaum Associates.
 Mandler, G. (2002). Consciousness recovered: Psychological functions and origins of conscious thought. Amsterdam/Philadelphia: John Benjamins.
 Mandler, G. (2007). A history of modern experimental psychology: From James and Wundt to cognitive science. Cambridge, MA: MIT Press. Reprint edition: Prentice-Hall.

References

Sources 
Baars, B. J. (1986). The cognitive revolution in psychology. New York, N.Y.: Guilford Press.
Kessen, W., Ortony, A., & Craik, F. (1991). Memories, thoughts, and emotions: Essays in honor of George Mandler. Hillsdale, N.J.: Lawrence Erlbaum Associates.
Kintsch, W., Miller, J. R., & Polson, P. G. (1984). Method and tactics in cognitive science. Hillsdale, N.J.: Lawrence Erlbaum Associates.
Mandler, G. (2001). Interesting times: An encounter with the 20th century, 1924-. Mahwah, NJ: Larry Erlbaum Associates.

External links
George Mandler's home page
Descriptions of Mandler's books

1924 births
2016 deaths
University of California, San Diego faculty
Fellows of the American Academy of Arts and Sciences
American people of Austrian-Jewish descent
20th-century American psychologists
United States Army personnel of World War II
Austrian emigrants to the United States
Austrian Jews
United States Army soldiers
Emotion psychologists
Academics of University College London
Fellows of the Cognitive Science Society
Center for Advanced Study in the Behavioral Sciences fellows
Ritchie Boys